Alexander Burns (12 August 1834 – 22 May 1900) was born in Northern Ireland and became a minister and educator in Canada.

References 

 

Canadian Protestant ministers and clergy
1834 births
1900 deaths
Irish emigrants to Canada (before 1923)